Manatuto is one of the municipalities (formerly districts) of East Timor, located in the central part of the country. It has a population of 45,541 (Census 2010) and an area of 1,783.3 km². The capital of the municipality is also named Manatuto. It is the least populated municipality of East Timor.

Etymology
The word Manatuto has been said to be a Portuguese approximation of the local Tetum and Galoli language word Manatutu, which means 'pecking birds'.

According to another source, the word is a portmanteau of the Tetum words Mana and tutu, which mean 'old woman' and 'peak' or 'summit', respectively. The legend goes that two groups of people were each living on the summit of a hill, one of them named Sau Raha (now Soraha) and the other Sau Lor (now Saulidun). The two groups were engaged separately in their own daily activities, but each was accompanied by one of two Liurai, who were brothers.

Geography
The borders of the municipality of Manatuto are identical to those of the council of Portuguese Timor with the same name.

The municipality borders the municipalities of Baucau and Viqueque to the east and Manufahi, Aileu, and Dili to the west.  It reaches both the south and north coasts of the island, and is only one of two municipalities to do so (the other is Lautém in the far east), and has the most geographical diversity.  To the north is the Strait of Wetar, to the south is the Timor Sea.

Administrative posts
The municipality's administrative posts (formerly sub-districts) are:

Barique-Natarbora (pop. 4,900)
Laclo (pop. 6,400)
Laclubar (pop. 10,100)
Laleia (pop. 3,200)
Manatuto (pop. 11,500)
Soibada (pop. 2,950)

The administrative posts are divided into 29 sucos ("villages") in total.

Demographics
In addition to the official languages of East Timor (Tetum and Portuguese), a large part of the population of the municipality speaks the Malayo-Polynesian language Galoli, which is designated as a "national language" by the constitution.

Notable people
The municipality is known as the birthplace of Xanana Gusmão, later to become the nation's first president. He was born in the village of Laleia (19 km East of Manatuto town).

References

Notes

Bibliography

External links 

  – official site (in Tetum with some content in English)
  – information page on Ministry of State Administration site 

 
Municipalities of East Timor